This is a list of the mammal species recorded in Cyprus. There are seventeen mammal species native to Cyprus, excluding feral species.

The following tags are used to highlight each species' conservation status as assessed by the International Union for Conservation of Nature:

Order: Lagomorpha (rabbits and hares) 

Despite their appearance, lagomorphs are not rodents, and fall in their own order. They consist of rabbits, hares, and pikas.
Family: Leporidae
Genus: Lepus
 Cape hare, L. capensis

Order: Rodentia (rodents) 

Rodents make up the largest order of mammals, with over 40% of mammalian species. They have two incisors in the upper and lower jaw which grow continually and must be kept short by gnawing.

Suborder: Sciurognathi
Family: Muridae (mice, rats, voles, gerbils, hamsters, etc.)
Subfamily: Deomyinae
Genus: Acomys
 Cyprus spiny mouse, A. nesiotes 
Subfamily: Murinae
Genus: Mus
 Cypriot mouse, M. cypriacus 
 House mouse, M. musculus  introduced
Genus: Rattus
 Brown rat, R. norvegicus  introduced
 Black rat, R. rattus  introduced

Order: Erinaceomorpha (hedgehogs and gymnures) 

The order Erinaceomorpha contains a single family, Erinaceidae, which comprise the hedgehogs and gymnures. The hedgehogs are easily recognised by their spines while gymnures look more like large rats.

Family: Erinaceidae (hedgehogs)
Subfamily: Erinaceinae
Genus: Hemiechinus
 Long-eared hedgehog, H. auritus

Order: Soricomorpha (shrews, moles, and solenodons) 

The "shrew-forms" are insectivorous mammals. The shrews and solenodons closely resemble mice while the moles are stout-bodied burrowers.
Family: Soricidae (shrews)
Subfamily: Crocidurinae
Genus: Crocidura
Lesser white-toothed shrew, C. suaveolens  introduced
Genus: Suncus
 Etruscan shrew, S. etruscus

Order: Chiroptera (bats) 

The bats' most distinguishing feature is that their forelimbs are developed as wings, making them the only mammals capable of flight. Bat species account for about 20% of all mammals.
Family: Pteropodidae (flying foxes, Old World fruit bats)
Subfamily: Pteropodinae
Genus: Rousettus
 Egyptian fruit bat, R. aegyptiacus 
Family: Vespertilionidae
Subfamily: Miniopterinae
Genus: Miniopterus
Common bent-wing bat, M. schreibersii 
Subfamily: Myotinae
Genus: Myotis
 Greater mouse-eared bat, M. myotis 
Subfamily: Vespertilioninae
Genus: Pipistrellus
 Common pipistrelle, P. pipistrellus 
Genus: Plecotus
 Grey long-eared bat, P. austriacus 
Family: Rhinolophidae
Subfamily: Rhinolophinae
Genus: Rhinolophus
 Blasius's horseshoe bat, R. blasii 
 Mediterranean horseshoe bat, R. euryale 
 Greater horseshoe bat, R. ferrumequinum

Order: Cetacea (whales) 

The order Cetacea includes whales, dolphins and porpoises. They are the mammals most fully adapted to aquatic life with a spindle-shaped nearly hairless body, protected by a thick layer of blubber, and forelimbs and tail modified to provide propulsion underwater.

Species listed below also includes species being recorded in Levantine Sea.
Suborder: Mysticeti
Family: Balaenopteridae
Genus: Balaenoptera
 Common minke whale, B. acutorostrata  
 Fin whale, B. physalus 
Subfamily: Megapterinae
Genus: Megaptera
 Humpback whale, M. novaeangliae  
Suborder: Odontoceti
Family: Physeteridae
Genus: Physeter
 Sperm whale, P. macrocephalus  
Family: Ziphidae
Genus: Mesoplodon
 Gervais' beaked whale, M. europaeus 
Genus: Ziphius
 Cuvier's beaked whale, Z. cavirostris  
Superfamily: Platanistoidea
Family: Delphinidae (marine dolphins)
Genus: Delphinus
 Short-beaked common dolphin, D. delphis 
Genus: Globicephala
 Long-finned pilot whale, G. melas 
Genus: Grampus
 Risso's dolphin, G. griseus 
Genus: Orcinus
 Orca, O. orca 
Genus: Pseudorca
 False killer whale, P. crassidens 
Genus: Stenella
 Striped dolphin, S. coeruleoalba 
Genus: Steno
 Rough-toothed dolphin, S. bredanensis 
Genus: Tursiops
 Common bottlenose dolphin, T. truncatus

Order: Carnivora (carnivorans) 

There are over 260 species of carnivorans, the majority of which feed primarily on meat. They have a characteristic skull shape and dentition.

Suborder: Caniformia
Family: Canidae (dogs, foxes)
Genus: Vulpes
 Red fox, V. vulpes 
 Cypriot red fox, V. v. indutus
Family: Phocidae (earless seals)
Genus: Monachus
 Mediterranean monk seal, M. monachus

Order: Artiodactyla (even-toed ungulates) 

The even-toed ungulates are ungulates whose weight is borne about equally by the third and fourth toes, rather than mostly or entirely by the third as in perissodactyls. There are about 220 artiodactyl species, including many that are of great economic importance to humans.

Family: Cervidae (deer)
Subfamily: Cervinae
Genus: Dama
 European fallow deer, D. dama 
Family: Bovidae (cattle, antelope, sheep, goats)
Subfamily: Caprinae
Genus: Ovis
 Mouflon, O. gmelini 
 Cyprus mouflon, O. g. ophion
Family: Suidae (pigs)
Genus: Sus
 Wild boar, S. scrofa

See also
List of chordate orders
Lists of mammals by region
Mammal classification

References

External links

M
Mammals
Cyprus
Cyprus
Cyprus